The Townsend Plan was an American scheme in 1933–1936 during the Great Depression in the United States to give every person over age 60 a monthly cash payment of $200. It was devised by Francis Townsend, an elderly California physician. The plan was promoted by real estate salesman Robert Clements, who made Townsend only a figurehead. It expanded to thousands of clubs in many states and demonstrated a nationwide demand for old-age pensions. The New Deal of President Franklin D. Roosevelt responded with a much more complex system of Social Security that was enacted in 1935 and that achieved many of the same goals on a more frugal basis.

Organization
Clements set up a for-profit organization, Old Age Revolving Pensions, Ltd., that published pamphlets and newsletters, and hired organizers to set up local clubs. By January 1935 there were 3000 clubs nationwide with 500,000 members. They circulated petitions to Congress with 20 million names. Washington rejected the plan as impractical. Nevertheless the company generated revenues from sales of pamphlets and merchandise, and from advertising, making a profit of $200,000 a year.

Plan details

The Townsend Plan proposed that every person over 60 be paid $200 per month. The Old-Age Revolving Pension fund was to be supported by a 2% national sales tax.

There were three requirements for beneficiaries under the Plan:

 they had to be retired;
 they had to be "free from habitual criminality;"
 they had to spend the money within 30 days (to stimulate the economy.)

Promoting the plan

In September 1933, Townsend wrote a letter to the editor of the local newspaper (the Long Beach Press-Telegram) and launched his career as an old-age activist.

According to Townsend's autobiographical memoir, New Horizons (1943), his plan originated when he looked out his window one morning in the early depth of the Depression and saw two old women, dressed in once nice, now tattered clothes, picking through his garbage cans looking for food.  Within two years of his putting forward his plan, over 3400 Townsend Plan Clubs were organized all over America and began exerting pressure on Congress to pass an old-age pension.

Frances Perkins, President Roosevelt's Secretary of Labor, in her memoir, The Roosevelt I Knew (p. 294) says that Roosevelt told her, "We have to have it [Social Security]. Congress can't stand the pressure of the Townsend Plan unless we have a real old-age insurance system."  As Roosevelt said, Social Security was passed by Congress substituting a pay-as-you-go "insurance" scheme for Townsend's far more generous pension plan, but as he told Perkins, it was the Townsend Clubs that forced Congress to act at all.

Later years 
Needing an alternative to the New Deal's Social Security system, many Republican members of Congress officially endorsed the Townsend Plan into the 1940s and 1950s. The Townsend Plan movement continued for four decades after Social Security became law in 1935, and beyond Townsend's death in 1960. In 1978, the national Townsend Plan was shut down, with only state chapters surviving, and that by then it had a "dwindling and aging membership."

See also
 New Deal coalition
 Social Security (United States)
 Ham and Eggs Movement
 End Poverty in California

References

Further reading
 Amenta, Edwin. “Political Contexts, Challenger Strategies, and Mobilization: Explaining  the Impact of the Townsend Plan.” in Routing the Opposition: Social Movements, Public  Policy and Democracy, edited by David S. Meyer et al.  (University of Minnesota Press, 2005). online
 Amenta, Edwin, Bruce Carruthers, and Yvonne Zylan. “A Hero for the Aged? The  Townsend Movement, the Political Mediation Model, and U.S. Old‐Age Policy, 1934-1950.” American Journal of Sociology (1992) 98: 308–339. online
 Amenta, Edwin, and Yvonne Zylan. "It happened here: Political opportunity, the new institutionalism, and the Townsend movement." American Sociological Review (1991): 250-265. online
 Amenta, Edwin. When movements matter: The Townsend plan and the rise of social security (Princeton University Press, 2008). online review
 Bennett, David H. "The Year of the Old Folks' Revolt," American Heritage (Dec 1964), 16#1 pp 48+ popular history.
 Gaydowski, John Duffy. "Eight Letters to the Editor: The Genesis of the Townsend National Recovery Plan." Southern California Quarterly 52.4 (1970): 365-382. online
 Lubove, Roy. "Economic Security and Social Conflict in America: The Early Twentieth Century, Part I." Journal of Social History (1967): 61-87. online part 1 also online part 2
 Messinger, Sheldon L. "Organizational transformation: A case study of a declining social movement." American Sociological Review 20.1 (1955): 3-10. online
 Mitchell, Daniel JB. "Townsend and Roosevelt: Lessons from the Struggle for Elderly Income Support." Labor History 42.3 (2001): 255-276. online
 Schlesinger, Jr. Arthur Meier. The Politics of Upheaval: 1935-1936, the Age of Roosevelt, Volume III (Houghton Mifflin, 1957) online, pp. 29–42.

Primary sources

 Dorman, Morgan J. Age before booty; an explanation of the Townsend plan (1936) online
 Gideonese, Harry, ed. The economic meaning of the Townsend plan (U of Chicago Press, 1936) online
 "The Townsend Crusade: An Impartial Review of the Townsend Movement and the Probable Effects of the Townsend Plan" Journal of the American Medical Association vol 107 (Oct. 1936) 10.1001/jama.1936.02770420068035

External links
 US Social Security Administration, "The Townsend Plan Movement," Social Security History.

Liberalism in the United States